Giuseppe Petrilli (1913? – 13 May 1999?) was an Italian professor and European Commissioner.

He was a non-politician appointed as the first Italian European Commissioner on the Hallstein Commission from January 1958 with responsibility for the Social Affairs portfolio.  In September 1960 (or December 1960, or 8 February 1961) he resigned and was succeeded by Lionello Levi Sandri.

A professor, Giuseppe Petrilli became president of IRI (the Italian Institute for Industrial Reconstruction – a powerful state-owned holding company) in 1960 and served for almost twenty years, until 1979.  He died on 13 May 1999, aged 86.

Commissioner Petrilli was a member of the 1979 group that produced the Spierenburg Report on the improvement of the working methods of the commission.

A Giuseppe Petrilli, left-wing Italian Christian Democrat (DC) member was appointed secretary general of the "EUCD" in 1978, according to the European Peoples Party.

A Giuseppe Petrelli became a member of the 8th Italian Senate after the 1979 elections.

References

External links

 
 PDF Analysis of Political Experience of Commission Membership
 IRI History (Italian)
 Historical events in the European integration process 1945–2009: Institutional Reform: The Spierenburg Report on CVCE website
  it.wiki – List of 7th Senate members

|-

1913 births
1999 deaths
Christian Democracy (Italy) politicians
20th-century Italian politicians
Italian European Commissioners